Leucinodes perlucidalis is a moth in the family Crambidae. It was described by Aristide Caradja in 1933. It is found in Guangdong, China.

References

Moths described in 1933
Spilomelinae